Freedom Service Dogs is a Denver, Colorado–based charitable organization devoted to rescuing dogs and training them as service dogs for people with disabilities that include multiple sclerosis, muscular dystrophy, Down syndrome, cerebral palsy, spinal-cord injury, PTSD, and more. The organisation is notable for its activities in providing assistance dogs to US veterans - one of the few such services that uses only rescued dogs.

Background 
FSD is a 501(c)3 nonprofit organization founded in 1987 by Michael and P.J. Roche. Freedom Service Dogs is an accredited and voting member of Assistance Dogs International, which sets and promotes standards and ethics for assistance dog training organizations all over the world.

FSD has partnered with the United States Veterans Administration to adopt dogs from animal shelters and train them to provide assistance dogs for veterans, part of a program by the VA to make the provision of an assistance dog an integrated part of treatment plans. In addition, FSD has partnered with the Peak Military Care Network to help provide service dogs to veterans.

Training 
The majority of animals entering the program are unwanted and/or abandoned dogs rescued from animal shelters. Each dog undergoes a comprehensive health assessment and a behavioral/training assessment. Dogs are then assigned a trainer and begin the 9- to 12-month training program.

Service dogs are trained to increase independence for people with disabilities. Each dog is matched to a specific client and custom trained according to his or her individual needs. Dogs can be trained to assist a client in their mobility, as well as retrieving items, fetching help, operating simple equipment (push a light switch or alert button). The dog also provides company, and can comfort their owner during nightmares or flashbacks.

Programs 
Operation Freedom - developed in 2009 to address problems experienced by soldiers returning from combat situations, such as PTSD, immobility, and inactivity, and provides dogs for veterans from Vietnam through the current conflict in Iraq and Afghanistan—and also for some active duty service personnel. FSD trains around 40 dogs a year through this program, at a cost of around $25,000 per dog. Costs are met largely through donations, and no charge is made to the recipient of the dog.
Pawsitive Connection - works with at-risk young people aged from 11 to 18 - particularly those in foster care, young people with ADHD and other learning issues, and young people in the juvenile justice system. The young people assist in training the dogs, supervised by teachers and a dog trainer. This occurs during the early phases of training when dogs are learning basic commands, and the students handle service dogs-in-training once a week for 8 to 12 weeks.
Professional Therapy Dogs - is a partnership between Freedom Service Dogs and the University of Denver Institute for Human/Animal Connection and Graduate School of Social Work. The program uses animal-assisted therapy to benefit people with mental and physical disabilities. FSD also provides dogs for work with other therapists.

References

External links 
 
 Trained Goldendoodle Puppies
 Assistance Dogs International Site
 Pet Dog Supplies & Products Store

Animal charities based in the United States
Dog welfare organizations
Assistance dogs
Disability organizations based in the United States
Charities based in Colorado